Jaine Lindo (born 22 September 1990) is a Sint Maartener footballer who plays for the Sint Maarten national team. Currently, he plays for Athletic Club of the Commonwealth in the Eastern Premier Soccer League in the USA.

International career
Lindo made his international debut for Sint Maarten on 10 September 2018, in a loss to Haiti, in a qualifying match for the 2019–20 CONCACAF Nations League. Lindo entered the game at halftime. He made another appearance versus Dominica in November 2018.

References

External links
 

1990 births
Living people
Sint Maarten footballers
Curaçao footballers
Dutch Antillean footballers
Sint Maarten international footballers
Association football midfielders
Expatriate soccer players in the United States
National Premier Soccer League players
NC Wesleyan Battling Bishops men's soccer players